Zlatko Radić (born 21 January 1972) is a politician in Serbia. He was a member of the National Assembly of Serbia from 2004 to 2007 and has served on the municipal council in his home community of Lapovo. Radić is a member of the far-right Serbian Radical Party (Srpska radikalna stranka, SRS).

Private career
Radić is an independent caterer.

Politician
Radić was the SRS's candidate for Lapovo's fourteenth division in the 2000 Serbian local elections. Like all party candidates in the municipality in this cycle, he was defeated.

He received the ninety-fourth position on the Radical Party's electoral list in the 2003 Serbian parliamentary election. The list won eighty-two mandates, and he was not initially included in the party's delegation. He was, however, awarded a mandate on 17 February 2004 as the replacement for another party member. (From 2000 to 2011, mandates in Serbian parliamentary elections were awarded to successful parties or coalitions rather than individual candidates, and it was common practice for the mandates to be assigned out of numerical order. Radić's list position had no formal bearing on whether or when he received a mandate.) Although the Radicals won more seats than any other party in the 2003 election, they fell well short of a majority and ultimately served in opposition. Radić was a member of the assembly committee on trade and tourism and the committee on poverty reduction.

Serbia changed its system of local elections in the 2004 cycle, introducing the direct election of mayors and proportional representation for local assemblies. Radić ran as the Radical Party's mayoral candidate in Lapovo and finished third. He also appeared in the second position on Radical list for the Lapovo assembly and was elected when it won six mandates.

Radić was not a candidate in the 2007 Serbian parliamentary election, and his parliamentary term ended that year. He appeared in the 189th position on the SRS list in the 2008 parliamentary election but was not given a mandate afterward. He was re-elected to the Lapovo assembly in the concurrent local elections after seemingly leading the Radical list.

The Radical Party experienced a serious split later in 2008, with several members joining the more moderate Serbian Progressive Party (Srpska napredna stranks, SNS) under the leadership of Tomislav Nikolić and Aleksandar Vučić. Radić remained with the Radicals. Serbia's electoral system was also reformed in 2011, such that mandates were awarded in numerical order to candidates on successful lists.

Radić was given the 229th position (out of 250) on the Radical Party's list in the 2012 Serbian parliamentary election. This was too low a position for election to be a realistic prospect, and the list did not cross the electoral threshold in any event. He also appeared in the second position on the party's list in the local elections; this list, too, failed to cross the threshold.

He again appeared in the second position on the SRS list for Lapovo in the 2016 Serbian local elections and was re-elected when the list won two mandates. The Serbian Renewal Movement (Srpski pokret obnove, SPO) won the election but did not have a majority and formed a grand coalition with the SNS. The SRS also participated in the government, and Radić was appointed to the municipal council (i.e., the executive branch of the municipal government) with responsibility for catering and tourism. He served for the term that followed.

Radić led the SRS list in Lapovo for the 2020 Serbian local elections and was re-elected when the list won a single mandate. He resigned on 16 November 2020.

Electoral record

Local (Lapovo)

References

1972 births
Living people
People from Lapovo
Members of the National Assembly (Serbia)
Serbian Radical Party politicians